Alexander Eason (8 November 1889 – 5 May 1956) was an Australian rules football player, coach and administrator in the Victorian Football League and Victorian Football Association.

Family
The seventh of the eight children of Richard Alexander Eason (1842–1909), and Annabella Bayfield Eason (1845–1921), née Sisson, Alexander Eason was born at Geelong, Victoria on 8 November 1889.

He married Sarah Isobel Huggett (1885–1950) in 1911. They had eight children.

One of his brothers, William Eason (1882–1957), played for, and coached Geelong in the VFL; another of his brothers, George Alexander Eason (1882–1957), was due to play for Geelong in its Finals match against St Kilda on 9 September 1899, but died as the consequence of a ruptured liver sustained in a football match, when playing for the Barwon Football Club, on the preceding Saturday; and his son, Richard Thomas Eason (1913–1979), played with both Footscray and Essendon in the VFL.

Football
Eason was a talented and hard-working player, nicknamed "Bunny" because of his speed. His accuracy with both kicking (particularly stab-kicking) and handpassing were highly regarded, as was his ability to win the ball from either his or his opponents' ruck tap-outs, and he was considered one of the finest rovers in Victoria in the early 1920s. He had two fingers on his right hand missing, but this did not greatly affect his skill. A highly regarded rover, Eason played most of his football for the Geelong Football Club, playing a total of 150 games for the club between 1909 and 1921. His time at Geelong was broken up by World War I: upon Geelong's withdrawal from the league in 1916, he crossed to Richmond and played twelve games there, before enlisting and serving in the war for the next two years. He returned to play for Geelong from 1919 until 1921, earning selection for Victoria in interstate football during that time.

In 1922, Eason crossed to Footscray in the VFA without a clearance, and played there until 1924, continuing to earn high acclaim and winning two premierships; he received £12 per week at Footscray, with the Sporting Globe reporting that he was the highest paid footballer at that time. In 1925, when Footscray joined the VFL, Eason was unable to remain with the club due to his suspension from the VFL for leaving Geelong without a clearance, and he crossed to Brighton for the final year of his senior career.

He later coached Footscray in the VFL for the 1929 season and Prahran in the latter part of the 1933 season. He became an administrator at Footscray, serving as chairman of selectors. He was well-regarded for his on-field and off-field wit, and wrote columns for the Sporting Globe.

Recognition
He is a member of Geelong's Hall of Fame and was named on the interchange bench of the club's Team of the Century.

Death
He died (suddenly) at Geelong on 5 May 1956, and was buried at the Footscray General Cemetery.

Footnotes

References 

 Hogan P: The Tigers of Old: A complete History of Every Player to Represent the Richmond Football Club between 1908 and 1996, Richmond FC, (Melbourne), 1996. 
 First World War Embarkation Roll: Private Alexander Eason (6999), collection of the Australian War Memorial.
 First World War Nominal Roll: Private Alexander Eason (6999), collection of the Australian War Memorial.
 First World War Service Record: Private Alexander Eason (6999), National Archives of Australia.

External links 

 Geelong Football Club website
 Profile at Full Points Footy

1889 births
1956 deaths
Carji Greeves Medal winners
Geelong Football Club players
Richmond Football Club players
Footscray Football Club (VFA) players
Brighton Football Club players
Western Bulldogs coaches
Prahran Football Club coaches
Australian rules footballers from Geelong
Australian military personnel of World War I
Military personnel from Victoria (Australia)
Australian people of English descent
Burials in Victoria (Australia)